Salcombe Regis is a coastal village near Sidmouth in Devon, England. Mentioned in the Domesday Book as "a manor called Selcoma" held by Osbern FitzOsbern, bishop of Exeter, the manor house stood on the site now occupied by Thorn Farm. The thorn tree growing in an enclosure at the road junction above the farm marked the cultivation boundary between manor and common ground.

The church of St Peter was built c. 1107 and restored in 1845. It contains monuments to the distinguished scientists Sir Ambrose Fleming and Sir Norman Lockyer, both buried there.

See also
Regis (Place)
List of place names with royal patronage in the United Kingdom

References

External links

 Image of an 1826 military boundary stone in the location of a semaphore signalling station (long gone)on the coastal path at Salcombe Hill

Villages in Devon
Seaside resorts in England
Beaches of Devon
Former manors in Devon
Sidmouth